Guardians of Ga'Hoole is a fantasy book series written by Kathryn Lasky and published by Scholastic. The series contains a total of 16 books and although originally intended to conclude with the 2008 publication of The War of the Ember, a prequel The Rise of a Legend was published in 2013. Apart from the main series there are a few more books and spin-offs set in the same universe. The first three books of the series were adapted into the animated 3D film Legend of the Guardians: The Owls of Ga'Hoole, directed by Zack Snyder.

Story 

This series follows the adventures of Soren, a young barn owl, for the first six books, but follows Nyroc, Soren's nephew, later renamed Coryn, for books seven through eight, and twelve through fifteen are books describing the Reign of King Coryn. Books nine through eleven are half-prequels to the other books, following the story of Hoole, the first king of the Ga'Hoole Tree.' The Capture 
Soren, a Barn Owl, or a Tyto Alba, lives in a nest in a hollow of a fir tree with his parents Noctus and Marella and siblings Kludd and Eglantine, who is newly hatched, in a forest kingdom called Tyto. Soren falls out of the nest and onto the bottom of the forest, a dangerous place for an owlet, an easy prey for raccoons. It is later revealed that Soren was pushed by Kludd, who performed the deed (or Tupsi) to become a member of the Pure Ones, an evil organisation which believes Tyto owls to be pure and should be positioned in a place of ascendancy. Soren is then found and snatched by a patrol of the evil owls from the St. Aegolius Academy for Orphaned Owls, or St. Aggie's. Soren and other snatched owlets are enslaved into tasks such as sorting eggs and pellets, for reasons they do not quite understand. Owls at St. Aggie's are "moon-blinked", a brainwashing technique caused by sleeping under the full moon and also marching under the light of the full moon and endlessly repeating their true names to forget them so as to lose a sense of self and will. Soren befriends a young elf owl named Gylfie (from the desert kingdom of Kuneer). Together, under the guise of being moon-blinked, they plot both to discover as much as possible about the true purpose behind St. Aggie's and to escape. Gylfie suspects that a spotted owl named Hortense is not moon-blinked. Soren and Gylfie then befriend her, and find out that Hortense is sneaking out eggs stolen by the owls of St. Aggie's and is returning them back to their parents with the help of two eagles, Zan and Streak. Hortense's intention is then discovered by the owls of St. Aggie's, and Hortense is then killed. Soren and Gylfie also find a partly moon-blinked boreal owl named Grimble and plan to escape with Grimble teaching them how to fly. Grimble is murdered the night Soren and Gylfie escape by St. Aggie's leader Skench the great horned owl and her lieutenant Spoorn the western screech owl. After escaping, they then meet Twilight, an orphan great gray owl who learned his survival instincts from the "Orphan School of Tough Learning", Digger, a burrowing owl, who lost his family to the St. Aggie's marauders and is extremely sensitive and philosophical, and the old Mrs. Plithiver, Soren's former nest-maid western blind snake.  With the help of Hortense's two bald eagle friends Streak and Zan, they kill two of St. Aggie's patrols, the cousins Jatt and Jutt the long-eared owls, and then the newly-formed band decide to head to the Guardians of Ga'hoole and inform them of the monstrosity of St. Aggie's.

 The Journey 
The four owls form a band and fly away in search of the Great Ga'Hoole Tree, where legend says the great knight-owls live who are dedicated to doing good deeds and eventually find it. Soon after the band arrives at the tree, they begin their training as guardians and soon are proficient in their selected chaws, or classes. They also meet other owls, such as Otulissa, a spotted owl, Primrose, a northern pygmy owl, Martin, a northern saw-whet owl, and learn many secrets such as colliering, navigation, search and rescue and weather navigation. Ezylryb, the old whiskered screech owl weather chaw ryb, or teacher, becomes good friends with Soren. After a long period of time passes, hundreds of owlets are found abandoned in the middle of an uninhabited forest, all of them "babbling of the purity of Tyto". Among these downed owlets, later called "The Great Downing", is Eglantine, Soren's lost sister. When she and the others regain full consciousness, they have no memory of what had happened, where they were from and why they were in the literal middle of nowhere. At the end of the book, Soren, along with his friends and his chaw, help fight a mysterious forest fire. After they put it out, it is revealed that Ezylryb was kidnapped.

 The Rescue 
When Ezylryb goes to investigate the area of The Great Downing and doesn't return, the Great Tree is unsettled. After a long while, the band goes to investigate the disappearance and seeks information of what could have happened. Octavia, Ezylryb's personal nest-maid Kielian snake and friend, gives them information that Ezylryb was also the famous warrior, Lyze of Kiel (Ezyl is Lyze spelled backward) and has personal relationships with the Rogue Smith of Silverveil. Then, during the time of copper-rose rain (how Autumn is called at the Great Tree), the band sneaks away during a week-long festival to go talk to the Rogue Smith in hopes they will not be noticed missing. When speaking with the Smith, they discover that the famous singer at the Great Tree, Madame Plonk, is the sister to the Smith and that there is a group of terrible owls known as The Pure Ones led by Metal Beak. Soon later, Eglantine begins remembering where she was at the time she was missing and tells the band that she remembers being in a castle during the imprisonment. Soren, Gylfie, Twilight, Digger, Eglantine, and Otulissa, called the "Chaw of Chaws", go out to find the castle in hopes that Ezylryb's disappearance might be answered. After nearly giving up, the Chaw of Chaws finds a Devil's Triangle, a triangle made up of large caches of magnetic particles, or "flecks", meant to discombobulate an owl's sense of direction and trap Ezylryb inside. The chaw realizes that these caches can be destroyed by fire and destroys the Devil's Triangle. Just as they free Ezylryb, a group of Barn owls, part of the regime The Pure Ones, attacks the Chaw, led by Metal Beak. The chaw picks up branches and sets them alight so that they can fight with fire, and part way through the battle, Martin, and Ruby, a short-eared owl, arrive. As the battle reaches its end, Metal Beak reveals his identity to the Chaw, now including Martin and Ruby, as being Kludd, Soren's evil brother. Soren, out of desperation, sets Kludd's mask on fire made of Mu metal, a soft metal that negates the magnetic powers of flecks, and he screams off as the metal melts on his face. Ezylryb and the Chaw of Chaws fly home and are met with cheering, and as daylight sets in, Ezylryb writes a poem of the impending war with the Pure Ones.

 The Siege 
Taking place immediately after the end of The Rescue, Kludd/Metal Beak has his mask still ablaze and he crashes into a pond near the hollow of Simon, a brown fish owl and a pilgrim from the Glauxian Brothers' Retreat. After Simon nurses Kludd back to health, Kludd murders Simon and flies up to a branch with another local owl on it. However, the other owl is a spotted owl named Mist and is practically invisible. At The Great Tree, Dewlap, the burrowing owl Ga'Hoolology ryb declares the topic of Higher Magnetics and the book Fleckasia and Other Disorders of the Gizzard "spronk", or banned knowledge, although it is crucial for the understanding of flecks and their effect on owls. Soon after, The Chaw of Chaws is contracted to the task of infiltrating the St. Aegolious Academy for Orphaned Owls on the speculation that the Pure Ones have infiltrated the academy for its large supply of flecks, and in the same meeting, Ezylryb gives Otulissa Fleckasia and Other Disorders of the Gizzard. Before alighting from the island, Dewlap finds Otulissa reading Fleckasia and Other Disorders of the Gizzard and sentences her to the Flint mops, which is the Great Tree's way of punishment. Otulissa goes with the punishment but eventually flies away to join the Chaw and as a result, Dewlap, "out of futile desperation", flings the book into the sea. Upon reaching St. Aggies, they are put through moon-blinking sessions, but each of the owls has memorized a part of the Ga'Hoolian cycle, such as the fire cycle, the war cycle, and the star cycle, in order to resist. Not long after their arrival, they discover barn owls sneaking flecks out of the library, where all of the flecks at St. Aggie's are kept. Due to Otulissa's ability to confuse one of the suspected infiltrators, she is brought up to the library to explain what Higher Magnetics is and from that, learns that one of the suspects is actually a double-agent for St. Aggie's. Meanwhile, at the Pure Ones' castle, the Rogue Smith of Silverveil is hired to make battle claws for the Pure Ones' army and from the information blabbed out by one of their generals, she learns that the Pure Ones are planning to launch an attack on the Great Tree and goes to tell Mist. At St. Aggie's, The Chaw of Chaws devise a plan to make the workers and the spies doubt each other to make them fight. During the commotion, Soren is struck in the rear, damaging his rudder feathers and on the way back to the Great Tree, he became gravely ill. As Soren nears death, a local spotted owl named Hortense brings a flying snake named Slynella, who has venom that can heal illness. After Soren regains his health, Mist reveals that she is the original Hortense and that the Pure Ones were planning to attack the Great Tree. The Chaw flies off towards the Great Tree to warn them of the impending attack and realize the true size of the Pure Ones' forces, which number in the thousands. The story tells of Kludd's initiation into the Pure Ones, as it is learned that he maimed a Non-Tyto, killed a nest maid snake and attempted to kill his younger brother by pushing him out of the nest. At the Great Tree, Ezylryb gives a speech, and the tree gets prep on the Pure Ones.

 The Shattering 
The situation at the Great Tree has become ever more complicated. Ginger, a reddish barn owl taken in during a Pure Ones attack, has become friends with Eglantine and Primrose, despite her still harboring their brutal ways (such as when she is caught toying with a mouse). In the aftermath, Eglantine begins to experience strange dreams of her mother, Marella, though she looks different and forgets things about Eglantine's past. A page from a mysterious book entitled 'Flecks' is given to Otulissa, and it is revealed that exposure to flecks can confuse an owl into believing fantasies, a condition called "shattering", leading the Band to discover that Ginger has slipped flecks into Eglantine's nest. In the meantime, Nyra has laid her and Kludd's first egg, referred to as 'The Sacred Orb'. Both Eglantine and Primrose, who followed her on one of her "dream" flights, end up in captivity of the Pure Ones. Primrose is almost shattered but uses a piece of amber to clean the flecks from her nest. During a battle in a burning forest, Eglantine and Primrose snatch the Sacred Orb, but Eglantine, still in her confused state, falls into a trance and comes dangerously close to being burned alive, accidentally destroying the egg in the process. Eglantine recovers and the Guardians return to the Great Tree.

 The Burning 
The Guardians seek help from the Northern Kingdoms, Ezylryb's hatching place, to defeat the Pure Ones once and for all. After brushes with pirate owls and polar bears, and most dangerously Ezylryb's treacherous younger brother Ifghar, the Guardians return to the Southern Kingdoms and Twilight kills Kludd in battle.

 The Hatchling 
After Kludd's death, Nyra, blinded by vengeance, raises their only hatchling, Nyroc, to take his place, and brainwashes him to hate Soren, blaming him for Kludd's death. During Nyroc's Final Ceremony, which entails the burning of his bones, the smith owl Gwyndor discovers that Nyroc has firesight (the ability to see visions in fire). This gives Nyroc the ability to see who actually killed his father. Despite being their leader's heir, Nyroc has only one real friend: a sooty owl named Dustytuft. However, Nyroc helps him recover his old name, Phillip. During the early parts of the book, Nyroc awaits the tupsi ceremony that will make him a true Pure One, which it turns out is the murder of his dearest friend, which he must perform himself. When Nyroc refuses to kill Phillip, Nyra does it herself, making her son declare his hatred of her and flee. While refusing to kill Phillip, Nyroc is given a scar on his face similar to Nyra's, causing others to fear him on sight. A rabbit who can see visions in spiderwebs tells him to go to the place his firesight visions showed him: Beyond the Beyond.

 The Outcast 
Nyroc casts off his old name and his old life, vowing to use his free will despite his father's scroom telling him otherwise. He is then found and brought to Mist, the old seeing owl once known as Hortense. From her, he learns to read and write and is told the stories of Hoole and the wolves of the Beyond, and even renames himself by turning his old name backward, giving himself the new name Coryn. On his way to Hoole he hears that a burrowing owl family has had their egg stolen by the Pure Ones and is determined to return the egg to them. Disguising himself as his mother's scroom, he rescues the egg and returns it to the family, in return they name the hatchling after Coryn. He then believes that with his firesight and the returned hatchling that he is to be the teacher of young Coryn, who he believes will be the new king. He then leaves to Beyond the Beyond to learn about teaching the young Coryn, and learns about the dire wolves. After one wolf hunt, he eats at the carcass with a grizzly bear and allows the wolves to join only if they send the deformed wolf Hamish to eat first. He and Hamish become friends and he learns about the order of wolves that guard the Ember of Hoole and how only deformed wolves can guard the ember, receiving a wish of new life after their life of service. Back in Hoole, rumors spread of Nyra's death, which she uses to her advantage and kills the rogue smith of Silverveil, stealing her things and impersonating her, which gains her valuable bargaining chips for one of her plans from a gullible magpie. She then flies to the Beyond to try to recruit owls and dire wolves for her army, striking a deal with a jealous clan of wolves who want the ember for themselves and maim their own pups in the hope they will be chosen as guardians. Coryn then uses his firesight to see his mother is near and to see the Ember of Hoole, which many believe makes him the rightful heir to the Great Tree. He then realizes his destiny and dives into the volcano to retrieve the Ember. He succeeds and through much enjoyment of owls and wolves, Nyra enacts her plan to steal the ember and kill her son. Many of her old enemies return to save Coryn and try to push her into a rabid wolf, but she escapes. The maimed wolves receive their wish of new life, all wishing to remain alive as wolves but with healed bodies. After goodbyes, Coryn flies to the Great Tree to meet his family and be named king.

 The First Collier 
On his deathbed, Ezylryb tells the Band to read the three legends hidden in his hollow. The first of them, this book, follows the story of Grank the first collier, how he met Fengo and found the Ember of Hoole. At first, the ember puts Grank into such a deep trance that after receiving visions of Hoole's parents, King H'rath and Queen Siv, in danger from Lord Arrin, a traitorous owl seeking to steal their egg and raise their hatchling, he does not go to help. Fengo breaks the trance and sends Grank to help them. Siv and Myrrthe, her faithful servant, seek shelter at a retreat, but the owls there are under a mind-controlling spell, forcing them to flee. Grank arrives and breaks the spell by throwing an ice splinter through the gizzard of their superior. Just as Grank and Siv reunite and plot to give Grank the egg, Lord Arrin's hagsfiend (monstrous owl/crow-like birds who have mastered evil magic) comrades arrive and Siv draws them away with a fake egg. Siv and Myrrthe seek shelter with a polar bear named Svenka, but the hagsfiends catch up and kill Myrrthe. While Lord Arrin is focused on Siv, the real egg, which is Hoole, the first king of Ga'Hoole, hatches while being kept by Grank and his apprentice Theo. In the present, Coryn realizes Nyra is a hagsfiend.

 The Coming of Hoole 
The story follows the hatching and the early life of Hoole. Hoole grows up with Grank, Theo, and his best friend, a young pygmy owl named Phineas. When Hoole and Siv meet for the first time, a hagsfiend attack forces them to separate, but Hoole realizes Siv is his mother from his firesight. The four travel to Beyond the Beyond, where the disgruntled wolf chieftain Dunleavy MacHeath leaves to betray Hoole to Lord Arrin. Meanwhile, the arch-hagsfiend Kreeth asks Lord Arrin's lieutenants, a hagsfiend named Ygryk and her owl mate Pleek, to find Hoole so she can use him to make hagsfiends immune to saltwater (they have no oil in their feathers to protect them). MacHeath is later killed by his eldest mate, who grew tired of his abuse and left his clan to form her own, and Hoole retrieves the Ember of Hoole during a battle which claims the life of Siv. In the present, Coryn and the Band realize that a "rip" in the fabric of the owl universe initially allowed magic to infect the hagsfiends, and it has allowed them to return from presumed extinction.

 To Be a King 
This book tells of Hoole's early days as king.

 The Golden Tree 
Back in the present, once the Ember of Hoole has been placed in the Tree, the Tree falls under a perpetual spell of golden-ness (which normally only happens in summer). The owls fall into a much more insidious fascination with the Ember and begin to worship it (to the chagrin of sensible owls like Otulissa and Bubo, the tree's blacksmith), constantly making up more and more ridiculous rituals for its adoration (such as flying around it and dipping their wingtips in its ashes). This culminates in a prison hollow being built in the Tree, which escapes Otulissa's knowledge until she is arrested for hiding a precious teacup Madame Plonk asked her to keep. Meanwhile, Coryn and the Band seek 'The Book of Kreeth', a book of magic practiced by an ancient arch-hagsfiend. A powerful sect of evil wolves known as 'vyrrwolves' impede their quest. However, the book is eventually recovered by a maimed pup called Cody, who dies in the attempt. During a battle with the Pure Ones, Coryn feels a strange power overcome him. At the same moment, the ember's glow dims at the moment Primrose performs the ceremony of removing the ashes, leading to her arrest on a false charge of blasphemy. When the Band return, they are horrified at the display and immediately rip down the trappings (which Gylfie notes look like a church). The ember is thrown into a pile of 'bonk' embers kept by Bubo.

 The River of Wind 
Otulissa learns from Bess, the Knower, that there is a sixth kingdom in the world of owls. This discovery would mean much to owlkind. She rushes off to tell the Band about this new kingdom, which they come to know that it is known as Jouzhenkyn, or the Middle Kingdom. After they read Bess' letter, they all decide they should tell no one of this discovery yet except Coryn, their king. Soren, Gylfie, Twilight, Digger, and Otulissa, go to Coryn's hollow and tell him of this news. Coryn grows excited when the Band tells him that they get to go to the Palace of Mists (Bess' secret location) first, a place very few owls know about, and even fewer have gone there. Soren's elderly nest-maid snake pleads the Band to let her travel with them, and they agree, so The Band, Otulissa, Coryn and Mrs. Plithiver leave the tree without notice to go to the Palace of Mists. While they are gone, Pelli, Soren's mate, is shocked to find Bell go missing after a weather  practice. Eglantine and Primrose, the aunt and godmother for the three B's, respectively, search for her for many nights, but they are unsuccessful in their search. At the Palace of Mists, Bess is relieved to find the Band there, but she is surprised to find Coryn there too, as she is not fond of much company and enjoys her solitude. For a few nights, the Band plus Otulissa and Coryn search the documents for any information for how to get to the Middle Kingdom, and what the place is like, and Otulissa also becomes quite fluent in the native language, Jouzhen. After finding a weather map that shows how to get across the Unnamed Sea (Sea of Vastness), they bid farewell to Bess and take off with very little supplies as a "river of wind" will carry them across the tomorrow line. Along the way, they find frightening carcasses of dead birds caught in tornadoes which remind them to be cautious. When they find a qui line, a piece of red ribbon, they follow it and the night suddenly becomes the morning. They swiftly make their way to the Middle Kingdom, where a blue Long-eared owl named Tengshu greets them. Meanwhile, Bell is being tended to by another blue owl from the Middle Kingdom, an escaped dragon owl called Orlando, but he tells Bell to call him Striga and lies about his origins. The Striga is being watched by some Pure Ones, who capture both Bell and Striga and take them to the Desert of Kuneer. There, with the help of a herbalist, they escape to the great tree and tell Doc Finebeak to get ready for an ambush in the Middle Kingdom, led by Nyra. In the Middle Kingdom, the Band and the others get word of the ambush plan, so they learn the way of Danyar, noble gentleness. They ultimately defeat Nyra and the Striga kills by spilling blood, against the way of Danyar, but since he saved Bell, the Guardians are indebted to him, so they take him back to the great tree where the Band and Coryn are welcomed back to the tree as heroes.

 Exile 
The Striga, a mysterious blue owl from the Middle Kingdom, gains control over young Coryn's mind. And then the unthinkable happens. The Band is banished from the Great Ga'Hoole Tree. The Striga institutes a harsh new regime that will not stop until learning itself- the very foundation of the tree- becomes suspect and books are burnt. Somehow the Band must open Coryn's eyes to the Striga's influence.

 The War of the Ember 
Dumpy, a puffin, discovers Nyra and the Striga working together in an ice cave to bring back the Hagsfiends. Scared, he tries to inform someone of this conspiracy but cannot, as all the other puffins he knows are as stupid as a rock. He then seeks out a polar bear known as Sveep and blurts out everything he saw. Sveep travels to Namara, the leader of the MacNamara clan of the Wolves of the Beyond, and informs her of what Dumpy had said. Namara then howls to the other clans about the grave danger, and all the wolf clans of the Beyond participate to relay this message to the rest of the kingdoms. Gwyndor, father of the Rogue Smith Gwynneth and one himself, hears the relay and flies to the Great Ga'Hoole Tree to inform them of this imminent danger to the Hoolian world. Meanwhile in the Palace of the Mists, Bess is about to sleep when a dying Boreal Owl comes flying to the hidden scholarly retreat. Bess attends to him. The owl whispers that he has been poisoned and that he wants to be sung to Glaumora. Without questioning him, she sings to him, then retreats to the maparium to sleep. Just as she is about to doze off, she hears a loud bang and peers out to see the supposedly 'dying' owl, now wearing deadly battle claws, obviously searching for the hidden Ember of Hoole. Bess, a pacifist, has to kill him to defend herself. She then flies to the Great Tree and reports what had happened. Soren, Coryn, the Band and Otulissa plan an extraction for the ember. They devise a plan where a few skilled owls from the tree take botkins to the Palace of Mists and Bess, her eyes closed, drops the ember into one of them. The fliers take different routes, not knowing which botkin the ember is in, and are tracked in the high cloud cover by the band. Tracking the Barn Owl Wensel from the cloud cover, Soren, using his extremely elusive auditory skills as a Barn Owl, then finds out that Wensel was about half a league off from his course, obviously thinking his botkin was the one with the ember. Soren also devises that he is flying towards the entrance of St. Aggies Academy. Wensel, Soren and Gylfie are then cornered by three owls flying straight towards them, sent by Nyra, but two Great Grays fight off the group, which includes Tarn, a Burrowing Owl working for the Pure Ones. In the Middle Kingdom, an alert page discovers a chamber littered with plucked feathers of the Blue Owls and realises that some owls of the Panqua Palace are defecting from the Middle Kingdom, learning to fly by plucking their extremely long tail-feathers. She reports this to the H'ryth on the Mountain of Time, knowing that the Panqua Court would not pay her any heed. Meanwhile Coryn, back at the tree, dispatches Otulissa and Cleve to the location provided by Dumpy, and Tengshu to the Middle Kingdom to ask the H'ryth for sanctuary to the Ember of Hoole. Otulissa and Cleve find a great massacre undertaken by the Blue Owls working with Nyra and the Striga. Another band of Haggish owls working with the Striga arrive at the point, and with Otulissa no match for them, Cleve surprisingly reveals his Danyar learning and immediately kills the Hagsfiend-like owls. Coryn and nest-maid Olivia travel to the Northern Kingdom to recruit other animals. The H'ryth, however, does not allow the ember to be kept in the Middle Kingdoms as he believes it will deceive Theo's teachings. Coryn decides to use the ember as bait for the Pure Ones and lure them to they beyond, where in the final battle he will later drop the ember in the Sacred Ring of Volcanoes and fight the Striga and Nyra with Soren at his side.

 The Rise of a Legend 
A prequel telling Ezylryb's backstory. In the time of Ezylryb's hatching, the Northern Kingdoms were torn apart by war, which had already killed his older brother and taken one of his mother's eyes. While still young, Lyze becomes jealous of a young snowy owl named Moss, due to him making milestones before Lyze, but attends a party in Moss's hollow and is shocked to discover he is shy. The two become fast friends and later meet Thora, who would later become the rogue smith of Silverveil, but who was then a runaway who could not stand her stepmother and wants to become the first female smith in the Northern Kingdoms. When Lyze is taken to observe the Kielian snakes, he befriends one named Hoke. Later, when observing the ice harvesters, he watches enemy owls engage them in battle. Lyze, Moss, and Thora become cadets, their early days punctuated by a traitorous cadet kidnapping Orf, a famous blacksmith, and their rescue of him. Lyze later meets a spirited female cadet named Lillium (Lil). Once allowed to go home, Lyze witnesses the hatching of his sister, Lysa, and instantly takes to her. However, she dies in a forest fire and their next sibling, Ifghar, does not captivate Lyze and often teases him. While at the academy, Lyze develops the idea of flying with Kielian snakes, using snow leopards on the ground, and using a special launcher to shoot burning metal spikes, though they abandon this last idea when they accidentally shoot a snow leopard. The war is hard-won, with Lil's death and Lyze breaking one of his talons, which leads to him biting it off, and one eye damaged so that it squints, leading to his distinctive appearance in the earlier books.

 Books in the series 
 Guardians of Ga'Hoole 
 The Capture (June 1, 2003)
 The Journey (September 1, 2003)
 The Rescue (January 1, 2004)
 The Siege (May 1, 2004)
 The Shattering (August 1, 2004)
 The Burning (November 1, 2004)
 The Hatchling (June 1, 2005)
 The Outcast (September 1, 2005)
 The First Collier (April 1, 2006)
 The Coming of Hoole (July 1, 2006)
 To Be a King (October 1, 2006)
 The Golden Tree (March 1, 2007)
 The River of Wind (July 1, 2007)
 Exile (February 1, 2008)
 The War of the Ember (November 1, 2008)
 The Rise of a Legend (2013)Announcement  on Kathryn Lasky's website.

 Legends of Hoole- The story of the Ga'hoole tree 
 The First Collier (2006)
 The Coming of Hoole (2006)
 To Be a King (2006)

The legends are a  part of the Band's experiences. A spin-off series of three books were planned, titled Legends of Ga’Hoole. However, the books were not published as a new spin-off series; instead the books were moved to the original Guardians of Ga'Hoole series, with the titles unchanged. They were numbered as books 9, 10, and 11 of the series. The advance copy editions show the subtitle on the covers, although the final editions were not released with this feature. A prologue and an epilogue were added to each book—in which Ezylryb instructs the Band to read the Legends hidden in a secret room before dying in his hollow—so as to tie the books together with the main series. The reading of the Legends later becomes important, as they play a crucial part in Soren's mentality in The Golden Tree (the first book released right after the three Legends, which resumes the adventures of Soren and the Band).

The three books—The First Collier, The Coming of Hoole, and To Be a King—are about the legendary young king Hoole the spotted owl, and his mentor (the first collier) Grank the older spotted owl (an old friend of Hoole's parents), along with the pacifist Theo the great horned owl, the first owl blacksmith. Grank was the first to find the Ember of Hoole, and King Hoole was the first to find the Great Ga'Hoole Tree. Hoole came under the protection of Grank because his mother, Queen Siv, was a close childhood friend of Grank's. Hoole also works to stop the tyranny of these demonic birds of prey called Hagsfiends (resembling a haggish-looking cross between owls and crows).

It is possible that the Legends of Ga'Hoole served as inspiration for the title of the movie adaptation Legend of the Guardians: The Owls of Ga'Hoole, although the movie loosely covered only the first three books of the series and has no relation to the Legends.

 Guide books 
Two guidebooks were released to give readers more insight into the world of Hoole. They are narrated by Otulissa.
 A Guide Book to the Great Tree (2007) (written during events between The River of Wind and Exile)
 Lost Tales of Ga'Hoole (2010) (written during events between The War of the Ember and Lone Wolf)

 Wolves of the Beyond Wolves of the Beyond is a spin-off series that tells the story of the "dire wolf" Faolan, his life and events in and around the territory known as the Beyond. Some returning characters from the original series include Gwynneth, the daughter of the renowned rogue smith Gwyndor (an Australian masked owl), as a main character, as well as Hamish, friend of King Coryn, clan leader Duncan MacDuncan of the dire wolves, and Soren). Legends and series history are frequently mentioned, including the stories of the ending battle of the first series, Guardians of Ga'hoole. 

This sequel of Guardians of Ga'hoole tells the story of Faolan, a dire wolf abandoned at birth because of a deformed paw, in accordance with wolf law. He is saved from death by a female grizzly bear known as Thunderheart, who had just lost her most recent cub to cougars. She teaches him to use his misshapen footpaw so that it cannot be regarded as a weakness, but a unique strength. The young wolf is reared by Thunderheart for the first year of his life, until they become separated in an earthquake. While searching for his foster mother (or "second Milk Giver"), he meets Gywnneth for the first time, who convinces him that despite the hardships he will face, he must return to the other wolves and join a clan. Faolan is not well-received, and is often regarded with suspicion and fear because of his bearish ways and an odd marking on his deformed paw, a spiral, that further sets him apart from his fellows. He begins clan life in the lowliest possible position, a gnaw wolf, and is subjected to verbal and physical abuse, along with minimal shares of food. He befriends fellow gnaw wolves Edme and the Whistler, but his superior carving skills set him against Heep, a tailless gnaw wolf with a thirst for power. Faolan eventually earns a place as a Watch wolf of the Ring of Sacred Volcanos, where special dire wolves guard the Ember of Hoole (the sacred coal that determines the ruler of owls), along with Edme. Faolan eventually meets his wolf mother and discovers he has two sisters who were not abandoned, Mhairie and Dearlea. A year later, a neverending winter ushers in famine, and many wolves are driven mad by starvation, forsaking their clan history and sense of self under the thrall of a death cult that offers to speed them to the Cave of Souls (heaven). To further decimate the failing wolf population, both the Beyond and much of the Owl Kingdoms are mostly destroyed by a cataclysmic earthquake, flattening the Ring of Sacred Volcanoes, and ending the service of the Watch Wolves, whose natural deformities are miraculously healed. Guided by the presence of a spirit connected to his spiral mark, Faolan leads his friends Edme, the Whistler, two grizzly bear brother cubs named Toby and Burney, a mother wolf named Caila and her pup Abban, an abandoned wolf pup named Myrrglosch, former Watch wolf Banja and her new pup Maudie, and two mated bald eagles named Eelon and Zanouche (the latter is the great-great-great-granddaughter of Streak and Zan) out of the Beyond. The travelers are helped along their way by some common puffins, narwhals, and banded woolly bears across a massive ice bridge over the sea, to a land called the Distant Blue to begin a new life. At the same time, they are being pursued by an evil rout of rogue dire wolves (or outclanners) led by the evil yellow dire wolf Heep. Faolan and Edme also discover that they are reincarnations of two great dire wolves from ancient times, lovers Fengo and Stormfast. Faolan finds that he, alongside Fengo, is a reincarnation of a heroic grizzly bear named Eo and a female snowy owl gadfeather named Fionula, an old friend of Madame Brunwella Plonk. After a series of bloody battles with Heep, the travelers vanquish the outclanners and reach the Distant Blue, where the weather is fair and wildlife is plentiful. A passing horse welcomes Faolan, the "star wolf," back to the land.
 Lone Wolf (2011)
 Shadow Wolf (2011)
 Watch Wolf (2012)
 Frost Wolf (2012)
 Spirit Wolf (2013)
 Star Wolf (2014)Star Wolf at Barnes & Noble

 Horses of the Dawn 
This series has a minor connection to Guardians of Ga'Hoole and Wolves of the Beyond as a standalone prequel and a historical fiction. Set during the Age of Discovery (specifically the early 1520s), it is a trilogy about a group of domestic horses who escape a human Spanish galleon leaving Cuba, led by a young filly named Estrella, who become feral. The herd must fight to stay alive in the new land of North America and seek out a new home of sweet-smelling grass that only Estrella herself can smell, where their ancestors evolutionarily originated, a valley somewhere along the western side of the Rocky Mountains called the Valley of the Dawn. Estrella is orphaned when her mother Perlina is devoured by a great white shark after being thrown off the ship (thrown overboard to make room for gold by the command of Hernán Cortés, who the horses call the Seeker) in the Caribbean Sea. Following the North Star, they travel far and wide up through the southern part of the continent - finding Chichen Itza in the Yucatan Peninsula, Tenochtitlan on Lake Texcoco in the Valley of Mexico (witnessing La Noche Triste), the Trans-Mexican Volcanic Belt pine-oak forests of migrating monarch butterflies, and even abandoned Puebloan cliff dwellings. They become known as the First Herd. They are later joined by an orphaned 12-year-old Native American human boy named Tijo (who learns how to speak to equines), some escaped mules and donkeys, a female bald eagle named Tenyak, a female mason bee named Grace, and a young male nameless coyote who later names himself Hope. Hope is the son of an evil coyote trickster, sometimes called First Angry, who often antagonizes the herd, but Hope is not sinister like his father. During their journey, they attempt to avoid and defeat a greedy and arrogant conquistador human going by the pseudonym El Miedo (his Christian name is Ignatio de Cristobal), a competitor of Cortes, briefly allied with an egotistical Andalusian stallion named Pegasus (Pego for short). In the second book, Star Rise, it is referenced that this series takes place long before Guardians of Ga'hoole for there is an oracular barn owl (a species the natives call the omo owl) featured that mentions to Tijo that things called Ga' and Hoole have not happened yet. (Guardians of Ga'hoole takes place in a post-apocalyptic world where humans are extinct, the geography changed, and certain new species evolved.) Also, just before the prologue of the same book, there is a quote from To Be a King. At the end of the third book, Wild Blood, when the crowd of animals finally reaches the legendary Valley of the Dawn, after being led the whole time by the spirits of an Eohippus, a human girl called First Girl, and Tijo's deceased wise stepmother Haru of the Burnt River Clan People, a connection is established to the ending of the sixth book in Wolves of the Beyond: Star Wolf, where Faolan, now back in his kind's (the dire wolves) original homeland, tentatively called the Distant Blue, with his team of fellow dire wolves and other animals, finds a narrow green valley inhabited by American bison and horses. One of these horses, a creamy white individual with a face scarred from a wildfire (making the face furless and "the skin crinkled up in ugly ridges"), is stationed on a promontory just ahead of Faolan, and using the memories of his past life--the legendary ancient dire wolf named Fengo who led the dire wolves on a similar quest--he discovers that this horse also has reincarnated memories of a past life of its own, as the equine recalls Fengo from the past, and acknowledges the ancient wolf is now reincarnated as Faolan.
 The Escape (2014)
 Star Rise (2015)
 Wild Blood (2016)

 Bears of the Ice 
This series is set during a time in the main series of Guardians of Ga'Hoole. Set in a faraway northern Arctic land north of the Northern Owl Kingdoms called the Nunquivik, a mother polar bear named Svenna is forced to leave her two cubs, temporarily named First and Second before they get proper names, to take their place in a twisted cult of polar bears, led by one called the Grand Patek, worshipping a mighty constructed clock (put together by owls and a few sophisticated bears), known as the Ice Clock, upon a tall glacier, thus they are obsessed with time in a more humanlike sense. This great-sized clock was originally only meant to help predict the second happening of a past glacial-melting event called the Great Melting. With the great mechanism no longer being treated as a tool but now as an idol, this cult abducts cubs and forces them to work inside the giant clock's gears, turning it until they either die or lose one body part without dying - these enslaved cubs are referred to by the cultists as Tick Tocks. Escaping the rude and secretly cannibalistic Taaka, their first cousin once removed (she is their mother's first cousin, who even Svenna barely knows), First and Second (both born with special psychic powers) journey to find their long-lost father Svern, later joined by their second cousins Third and Froya. At the same time, the Grand Patek (the leader of the clock-worshipping bears) devises a master plan to even enslave the lands beyond the Nunquivik, even the Northern Owl Kingdoms. Svenna and Svern were both originally born and raised in the Northern Owl Kingdoms and thus know how to read and write. At one point in the first book it is revealed that Svenna knows the deceased Lyze of Kiel, or Ezylryb, and wonders what has happened back in the Owl Kingdoms since his death. It is also revealed that Svarr and Svenka, a clever polar bear from the time of Hoole (featured in The Coming of Hoole and To Be a King) who knew how to eavesdrop on others by listening through smee holes (natural steam vents), were Stellan and Jytte's ancestors.

 The Quest of the Cubs (2018)
 The Den of Forever Frost (2018)
 The Keepers of the Keys'' (2019)

Characters

Movie adaptation 

A 3D computer-animated film adaptation of the book was released by Warner Bros. in 2010. Zack Snyder directed the film as an animation debut with Jim Sturgess, Geoffrey Rush, Emily Barclay, Helen Mirren, Ryan Kwanten, Anthony LaPaglia, and David Wenham voicing the characters.

Video game adaptation

References

External links 
 
 Kathryn Lasky's website
 Interview with Kathryn Lasky, BookReviewsAndMore.ca

 
Fantasy novel series
Novels by Kathryn Lasky
Fictional owls
American fantasy novels
Fantasy books by series
Book series introduced in 2003
2003 American novels
2000s children's books
Novels about animals